Furileusauria ("stiff back lizards") is an extinct clade of derived abelisaurid dinosaurs only known from South American fossil remains. The clade is defined as the most inclusive clade containing Carnotaurus sastrei but not Ilokelesia aguadagrandensis, Skorpiovenator bustingorryi, or Majungasaurus crenatissimus.

Classification

Distinguishing traits 
Furileusauria is distinguished by several traits exclusive to the members of this clade. These are:

 the presence of a tip in the middle area of the posterior surface of the ventral process of the postorbital
 the presence of a knob followed by a deep notch in the postorbital-squamosal contact
 the absence of fenestra between the frontal, postorbital and lacrimal
 an anterior projection of the distal end of the cervical epiphophyses
 the posterior margin of the postzygapophyses at level with the intervertebral articulation in dorsal vertebrae
 a crescent-shaped morphology of the distal tip of the transverse processes in anterior and middle caudal vertebrae
 the transverse processes of anterior caudal vertebrae distally expanded and only anteriorly projected
 a convex external margin of the transverse processes in anterior caudal vertebrae
 cnemial crest of the tibia with a downturned process

Phylogeny 
In the description of the abelisaurid Llukalkan, the authors performed a phylogenetic analysis to test the affinities of the new taxon. The simplified strict consensus tree of the analysis is shown below.

See also 

 Timeline of ceratosaur research

References 

Abelisaurs
Late Cretaceous dinosaurs of South America